Michael J. Barrier (born June 15, 1940) is an American animation historian.

Work
Barrier was the founder and editor of Funnyworld, the first magazine exclusively devoted to comics and animation. It began as a contribution to the CAPA-Alpha amateur press association. Beginning in 1970 it expanded to being a magazine of general circulation that eventually had a print run of several thousand before ceasing publication in the early 1980s.

Barrier was also an early champion of the work of comic book artist Carl Barks, in a period when comic book fandom was mostly devoted to the celebration of superheroes and tended to denigrate talking animal comics. Barrier serialized a bibliography of Barks' work in Funnyworld and in 1968 contributed an extensive essay analyzing Barks' work to the seventh issue of the Don and Maggie Thompsons' pioneering fanzine Comic Art. The essay and bibliography installments were the genesis  for Barrier's 1982 book Carl Barks and the Art of the Comic Book, still considered the essential work on the artist. Long out of print (and the object of less than pleasant relations between Barrier and the publisher) Barrier has stated a new edition "which will be so extensively revised, as well as retitled, that it will really be a new book—will be published eventually by Fantagraphics Books."

In 1973, Barrier signed a contract with Oxford University Press to write a history of Hollywood animation. The research and writing of that book extended over twenty-four years. With the aid of associate (and animator) Milt Gray, Barrier undertook extensive research and interviews of all the key figures who played a role in the creation of classic American theatrical animation, mainly that of Disney (Silly Symphonies and Mickey Mouse), Warner Bros. (Looney Tunes and Merrie Melodies), MGM (such as the Tom and Jerry series) and the Fleischer/Famous studios. That research provided the basis of his landmark 700-page history of classic animation, Hollywood Cartoons: American Animation in Its Golden Age (published in hardcover in 1999 and reissued and revised as a trade paperback in October 2003).

Barrier also provided several audio commentaries for the first five Looney Tunes Golden Collection DVD box sets, his largest audio contributions being for the first volume.  He has also appeared in documentaries about animation. Barrier's most recent book is a biography of Walt Disney, The Animated Man: A Life of Walt Disney.  A review of the book by Jeff Ayers described it as "More of a critical slam of Disney's cartoons and films than a useful biography, this book will disappoint, bore, or anger fans of the man." Disney historian Wade Sampson in a contrary view stated "If you are a fan of Walt Disney and want information that you know you can trust, then I definitely recommend you add this book to your collection."
 
Barrier's next book was Funnybooks: The Improbable Glories of the Best American Comic Books (2014), "a book on comic books that will pay much less attention to superheroes than the usual comic-book history and much more to the likes of Carl Barks, Walt Kelly, and John Stanley—that is, to the mainstays of the Dell line, as well as to such significant creators as Will Eisner and Harvey Kurtzman."

Barrier at one point engaged in a lengthy discussion on animation topics with John Kricfalusi that he was allowed to post on his website.

With writer Martin Williams, Barrier co-edited A Smithsonian Book of Comic-Book Comics (1982).

References

External links

The Best Walt Disney Biographies

1940 births
Living people
American film critics
American male non-fiction writers
Historians of animation
Inkpot Award winners
American film historians
20th-century American historians
21st-century American historians
21st-century American male writers
Comics scholars